The Republic of the Congo is divided into 12 départements (départements). Departments are divided into communes and/or districts; which are further subdivided into urban communities (communautés urbaines) and rural communities (communautés rurales); which are further subdivided into quarters or neighborhoods (quartiers) and villages.

These are:

 Bouenza
 Cuvette
 Cuvette-Ouest
 Kouilou
 Lékoumou
 Brazzaville
 Likouala
 Niari
 Plateaux
 Pool
 Sangha
 Pointe-Noire

References 

 
Congo
Congo, Republic Of The